Sydney Ward (born 26 November 1923) was an English professional footballer who played as a goalkeeper.

Career
Born in Dewsbury, Ward signed for Bradford City from Upton Colliery in September 1947. He made 2 league appearances for the club, before being released in 1948.

Sources

References

1923 births
Date of death missing
English footballers
Upton Colliery F.C. players
Bradford City A.F.C. players
English Football League players
Association football goalkeepers